The Long Chance is a 1922 American silent Western film directed by Jack Conway and starring Henry B. Walthall, Marjorie Daw and Ralph Graves.

Cast
 Henry B. Walthall as Harley P. Hennage 
 Marjorie Daw as Kate Corbaly / Dana Corbaly 
 Ralph Graves as Bob McGraw 
 Jack Curtis as 'Borax' O'Rourke 
 Tom London as John Corbaly 
 Boyd Irwin as 'Boston' 
 William Bertram as Sam Singer 
 Grace Marvin as Soft Wind 
 George A. Williams as Dr. Taylor

References

Bibliography
 James Robert Parish & Michael R. Pitts. Film directors: a guide to their American films. Scarecrow Press, 1974.

External links
 

1922 films
1922 Western (genre) films
1920s English-language films
Films directed by Jack Conway
American black-and-white films
Universal Pictures films
Silent American Western (genre) films
1920s American films